Deacon Hill may refer to:
Deacon Hill SSSI, protected area in Bedfordshire, United Kingdom
Deacon Hill (Antarctica) on Coronation Island in the South Orkney Islands